Marginellopsis is a genus of very small sea snails, marine gastropod mollusks or micromollusks in the family Granulinidae.

Species
Species within the genus Marginellopsis include:
 Marginellopsis herosae Bonfitto & Smriglio, 2019
 Marginellopsis jamaicensis Cossignani & Lorenz, 2019
 Marginellopsis margaritella (Faber, 2006)
 Marginellopsis pulvis (Jousseaume, 1875)
 Marginellopsis rineri Ortea, 2020
 Marginellopsis serrei Bavay, 1911
Species brought into synonymy
 Marginellopsis marondei F. Riedel, 2000: synonym of Pugnus serrei (Bavay, 1911) accepted as Marginellopsis serrei Bavay, 1911

References

 Jousseaume, F., 1875. Coquilles de la famille des marginelles, Monographie. Revue et Magasin de Zoologie Pure et Appliquée 3(3): 164-278; 429-435
 Boyer F. (2017). Révision de l'organisation supra-spécifique des gastéropodes granuliniformes. Xenophora Taxonomy. 16: 25-38

External links
 Bavay A. (1911). Une marginellidée nouvelle de Cuba. Bulletin du Muséum National d'Histoire Naturelle. 17(4): 240-243

Granulinidae